Charles Grosvenor Bond (May 29, 1877 – January 10, 1974) was a Republican United States Representative from the state of New York who served in the 67th United States Congress.

Biography
Bond, a nephew of American Civil War general Charles H. Grosvenor, was born in Columbus, Ohio, the son of William W. and Frances (Currier) Bond. He attended the public schools; was graduated from the law department of Ohio State University at Columbus in 1899; was admitted to the bar the same year and commenced the practice of law in Columbus, Ohio. He moved to New York City in 1903 and continued the practice of his profession. He married Bertha Gildersleeve Paterson on June 27, 1905.

Career
Elected as a Republican, Bond served one term as U. S. Representative from New York's eighth district in the Sixty-seventh United States Congress from March 4, 1921, to March 3, 1923.

Defeated in 1922, Bond resumed the practice of law and made an unsuccessful bid for the borough presidency of Brooklyn in 1926. He was the attorney for writer O. Henry, and was a delegate to Republican National Convention from New York, 1936. He served as chairman of the Alcohol Beverage Control Board of New York City from 1934 to 1970 when he retired at 93 years of age.

Death
Bond died in Bound Brook, New Jersey, on January 10, 1974 (age 96 years, 226 days). He was cremated and his ashes are interred at West Union Street Cemetery, Athens, Ohio. His granddaughter, Geraldine Bond Laybourne, founded the Oxygen Network after leading Nickelodeon's huge growth in the 1970s and '80s.

References

External links

1877 births
1974 deaths
Ohio State University Moritz College of Law alumni
Politicians from Columbus, Ohio
Politicians from Brooklyn
Republican Party members of the United States House of Representatives from New York (state)
Lawyers from Columbus, Ohio